The 23rd South East Asian Junior and Cadet Table Tennis Championships 2017 were held in Singapore.

Medal summary

Events

Medal table

See also

2017 World Junior Table Tennis Championships
2017 Asian Junior and Cadet Table Tennis Championships
Asian Table Tennis Union

References

South East Asian Table Tennis Championships
South East Asian Junior and Cadet Table Tennis Championships
South East Asian Junior and Cadet Table Tennis Championships
South East Asian Junior and Cadet Table Tennis Championships
Table tennis competitions in Singapore
International sports competitions hosted by Singapore
South East Asian Junior and Cadet Table Tennis Championships